Tehi is a village and one of the 23 union councils of Talagang Tehsil, Chakwal District in the Punjab Province of Pakistan.

References

Union councils of Chakwal District
Populated places in Chakwal District